Miramonte (Spanish for "Mountain View") is an unincorporated community in Fresno County, California.

History
The community was formerly known as Rancho Miramontes.

The first Miramonte post office opened in 1909, was discontinued in 1912, and re-established in 1923.

References

Unincorporated communities in California
Unincorporated communities in Fresno County, California